The Port of Socotra is a port in Yemen. It is located in Socotra Governorate.

History 
The port was constructed in 1996 with a 45-meter berth and a 5-meter draft. It is the only marine seaport to supply the Island with oil derivatives and foodstuffs.

Location 
The Port of Socotra is located in the Island of Socotra in the Indian Ocean. It is the only port in the island and situated 5 kilometres (3.1 miles) east of Hadibu, the capital of Socotra, one of the strategic and important Islands in the Republic of Yemen.

See also 

 Socotra

 Yemen Arabian Sea Ports Corporation

 Port of Mukalla
 Port of Aden
 Hudaydah Port

References

External links 
 

Socotra
Government of Yemen
Transport in Yemen
Socotra Governorate
Ports and harbours of Yemen